Mark Mathew Braunstein (born August 6, 1951) is an American writer, nature photographer, art librarian, and advocate of medical marijuana legalization.  His writing focuses on the topics of vegetarianism/veganism, wildlife conservation, animal rights, sprouting, and raw food. Braunstein has written six books, including his sixth, Mindful Marijuana Smoking: Health Tips for Cannabis Smokers, and his first, Radical Vegetarianism: A Dialectic of Diet and Ethic, and many magazine articles.

Life
Braunstein was born in New York City.  His parents were Benjamin and Clare (Pitalon) Braunstein.  Benjamin Braunstein (died 2005) was a book critic and a literature and journalism teacher at Bayside High School, Queens, New York City. Clare Braunstein (January 20, 1926 - April 5, 2011) was a homemaker and an editor of the Hadassah newsletter, and of its cookbook entitled One People, One Heart: Culinary Classics. Mark Braunstein has a brother, Jack A. Braunstein of Gibson, Pennsylvania.

In 1969, Mark Braunstein graduated from Farmingdale High School (Farmingdale, New York) In 1974 he received his B.A. degree from the State University of New York at Binghamton.  In 1978 he received a Master of Science degree at Pratt Institute, Brooklyn.

From 1978 to 1980, Braunstein was Editor at Rosenthal Arts Slides, Chicago. From 1980 to 1983 he was Assistant editor at Art Index in New York City. From 1983 to 1987 he was Head of slides and photographs at Rhode Island School of Design in Providence. Since 1987, he has been an art curator and art librarian at Connecticut College, New London, Connecticut.

Braunstein has been a vegetarian since 1966 and a vegan since 1970.

In 1981, Braunstein published his book, Radical Vegetarianism: A Dialectic of Diet and Ethic.

An "About the Author" blurb in 1990 said this:
Mark M. Braunstein is the author of Radical Vegetarianism: A Dialectic of Diet & Ethic. In addition to editing reference books on art history, he writes about animal rights and wildlife for journals such as Animals' Agenda, Between the Species, Vegetarian Times, Backpacker and East West. He lives in a wildlife refuge in Quaker Hill, CT, where his favourite hobby is sabotaging hunting. He served as the guest editor for this issue of the Trumpeter.

On August 6, 1990 (his 39th birthday), Braunstein became a paraplegic due to a spinal cord injury from a diving accident. Since then, he smokes marijuana to control the pain and spasms in his feet and has been an advocate of medical marijuana legalization.  He testified before committees of the Connecticut legislature seven times over 14 years, urging passage of bills to legalize medical marijuana.

Braunstein, after discovering that some prostitutes were meeting with clients on his private road, began documenting their lives. From his photographs of them and their life stories collected over a ten-year period, he created a literary and photography project entitled "Good Girls on Bad Drugs", which explores the lives of streetwalkers in the New London, Connecticut, area. In October 2017, Braunstein published a book entitled Good Girls on Bad Drugs: Addiction Nonfiction of the Unhappy Hookers.

His sixth and most recent book, Mindful Marijuana Smoking: Health Tips for Cannabis Smokers, was published in 2022.

Braunstein is single and lives in Quaker Hill, Connecticut.

Books

 LCCN 2009024467. Foreword by Viktoras Kulvinskas.

 LCCN 99014286.

 LCCN 2013002999.

 LCCN 2018966460
Braunstein, Mark Mathew (2022-07-17). Mindful Marijuana Smoking: Health Tips for Cannabis Smokers. Rowman & Littlefield Publishers. ISBN 978-1538156674. LCCN 2021051061

Articles

 Check the issn.

See also 

Animal protectionism
Animal Rights
Hunt sabotage
Medical cannabis
Drugs and prostitution

Notes

External links 

 TV documentary about Braunstein's injury & recovery from his plunge into paraplegia by diving off a footbridge into a river.

1951 births
Living people
20th-century American non-fiction writers
21st-century American Jews
21st-century American non-fiction writers
American animal rights scholars
American people with disabilities
American veganism activists
Binghamton University alumni
Farmingdale High School alumni
Jewish American writers
People with paraplegia
Pratt Institute alumni
Raw foodists